Sir Francis Vincent, 7th Baronet, ( – 22 May 1775) of Stoke D'Abernon, was an English country landowner and politician who sat in the House of Commons from 1761 to 1775.

The eldest son of Sir Henry Vincent, 6th Baronet, he was educated at Lincoln's Inn in 1734. He succeeded his father in the baronetcy on 10 January 1757.

He was Member of Parliament for Surrey  from 1761 until his death on 22 May 1775.

He married three times; firstly Elizabeth, the daughter and heiress of David Kilmaine, a London banker, secondly Mary, the daughter of Lt.-Gen. Hon. Thomas Howard of Great Bookham, Surrey, with whom he had 2 sons and a daughter and thirdly Arabella, the daughter and coheiress of Sir John Astley, 2nd Baronet and the widow of Anthony Langley Swymmer. He was succeeded by his son, Francis, the 8th baronet.

References

1710s births
1775 deaths
Members of Lincoln's Inn
Baronets in the Baronetage of England
Members of the Parliament of Great Britain for English constituencies
British MPs 1761–1768
British MPs 1768–1774
British MPs 1774–1780
People from Stoke d'Abernon